Tomáš Kvapil (18 December 1955 – 28 November 2022) was a Czech politician. A member of KDU-ČSL, he served as Minister of Regional Development from 1997 to 1998 and served in the Chamber of Deputies from 1998 to 2010.

Kvapil died on 28 November 2022, at the age of 66.

References

1955 births
2022 deaths
Politicians from Olomouc
Czech politicians
Regional Development ministers of the Czech Republic
Members of the Chamber of Deputies of the Czech Republic (1998–2002)
Members of the Chamber of Deputies of the Czech Republic (2002–2006)
Members of the Chamber of Deputies of the Czech Republic (2006–2010)